To You with Love, Donny is the second studio album by American singer, Donny Osmond, released in 1971. The album reached number 12 on the Billboard Top LPs chart on November 27, 1971. "Go Away Little Girl" was released as a single and it reached No. 1 on the Billboard Hot 100.  The album was certified Gold by the RIAA on January 26, 1972.

Track listing

Certifications

References

1971 albums
Donny Osmond albums
MGM Records albums